Sebastián Solé (born 12 June 1991) is an Argentine–Italian volleyball player, a former member of the Argentine national team. Bronze medallist at the Olympic Games (Tokyo 2020), Italian Champion (2015). At the professional club level, he plays for Sir Safety Perugia.

Junior career
Solé's international career began in 2007 as one of the new players called up for the Argentine Youth Team. In 2008 he was the only player on both of Argentina's South American Championship winning teams, representing Argentina in the youth and junior teams.

Career
In 2010 Solé made his senior debut for Argentina at the FIVB World League. He participated seven times in that competition and won several awards and medals. He was also part of the team at the 2010 FIVB World Championship in Italy and at the Olympic Games in London in 2012. In 2015 Solé was the first Argentine player in 18 years to be part of an Italian A1 League winning team. He also shone in 2016 at the 2016 Summer Olympics and won the Olympia Award for being the best volleyball player of the country.

After winning the bronze medal in Tokyo Olympics, he announced his retirement from Argentina national team.

Sporting achievements

Clubs
 CEV Champions League 
  2015/2016 – with Diatec Trentino

 FIVB Club World Championship
  Betim 2022 – with Sir Safety Perugia

 CSV South American Club Championship
  Argentina 2010 – with Bolívar Vóley

 National championships
 2013/2014  Italian SuperCup, with Diatec Trentino
 2014/2015  Italian Championship, with Diatec Trentino
 2022/2023  Italian SuperCup, with Sir Safety Susa Perugia

Individual awards
 2009: FIVB U19 World Championship – Best Blocker
 2011: CSV South American Championship – Best Blocker
 2013: CSV South American Championship – Best Middle Blocker
 2015: FIVB World Cup – Best Middle Blocker
 2016: CEV Champions League – Best Middle Blocker

References

External links

 
 
 
 Player profile at LegaVolley.it 
 Player profile at Volleybox.net 

1991 births
Living people
Naturalised citizens of Italy
Sportspeople from Rosario, Santa Fe
Argentine men's volleyball players
Olympic volleyball players of Argentina
Volleyball players at the 2012 Summer Olympics
Volleyball players at the 2016 Summer Olympics
Volleyball players at the 2020 Summer Olympics
Olympic medalists in volleyball
Olympic bronze medalists for Argentina
Medalists at the 2020 Summer Olympics
Volleyball players at the 2011 Pan American Games
Volleyball players at the 2015 Pan American Games
Pan American Games medalists in volleyball
Pan American Games gold medalists for Argentina
Pan American Games bronze medalists for Argentina
Medalists at the 2011 Pan American Games
Medalists at the 2015 Pan American Games
Argentine expatriate sportspeople in Italy
Expatriate volleyball players in Italy
Argentine expatriate sportspeople in Brazil
Expatriate volleyball players in Brazil
Middle blockers